Alfonso González Nieto (born 2 December 1978 in Madrid, Spain), better known as Fonsi Nieto, is a former Grand Prix motorcycle road racer and the nephew of successful Grand Prix motorcycle road racer Ángel Nieto. After success in the 250cc class he moved to World Superbikes and made one MotoGP start. For 2010 he returned to the Grand Prix scene in the newly formed Moto2 category. Nieto announced his retirement from competition in early 2011 after failing to recover from injuries suffered when racing at Indianapolis in 2010.

Early years
He won the Spanish 125cc championship in 1998, and the Spanish 250cc champion in 1999 and 2000, also winning the less prestigious European 125cc title in 1997. In 1999 and 2000 he raced in the 250cc World Championship alongside his domestic commitments, finishing 14th overall on a Yamaha TZ250 with a best result of 6th at Estoril in 2000.

250cc World Championship
He was 4th in the world championship in 2001, with 4 successive 5th places early in the season and a pair of late-season podium finishes. He won 4 races in 2002, finishing 2nd to Marco Melandri. He was then 5th in 2003 with a win at Donington Park, and 7th in 2004.

Superbike World Championship

In  he entered the Superbike World Championship with the Caracchi Ducati team, finishing 17th overall in the championship. A fourth in Round 4 of the season was the highlight; he only reached the top 10 once more. For  and  he rode for PSG-Kawasaki. His first podium finish came in Race 2 at Assen in 2006, following teammate Chris Walker's victory in the first race. He was also third at Magny-Cours in 2007. He took pole position at Lausitzring in 2007 after finding a dry spell in a wet qualifying session.

In 2007 he also replaced the injured Olivier Jacque in the French Grand Prix making his debut in the MotoGP class, finishing the race in 11th place.

For  he joined Alstare Suzuki, making an immediate impact by winning his first world superbike race in the second race of the opening round in Qatar. He finished the season 7th overall, but lost his  ride as the team scaled back to two riders and retained the less successful Japanese Yukio Kagayama. However, Nieto returned to the team mid-season after Max Neukirchner was injured.

Career statistics

Races by year
(key) (Races in bold indicate pole position, races in italics indicate fastest lap)

References

External links

 fonsinieto.com Official website

1978 births
Living people
Sportspeople from Madrid
Spanish motorcycle racers
Spanish racing drivers
Superbike World Championship riders
125cc World Championship riders
250cc World Championship riders
Moto2 World Championship riders
Kawasaki Motors Racing MotoGP riders
European Le Mans Series drivers
MotoGP World Championship riders